Liberty Bell Junior-Senior High School is a high school in Okanogan County, Washington, USA. The school is part of the Methow Valley School District and is located between Twisp and Winthrop. The school serves the towns of Twisp, Winthrop, Mazama and Carlton.

The school was established in 1973, replacing the former Twisp High School and Winthrop High School. In 2005, Liberty Bell had an enrollment of 568 students, K-12. The school is ranked tenth best for the state of Washington.

External links
Liberty Bell Junior-Senior High School

High schools in Okanogan County, Washington
Public high schools in Washington (state)
Public middle schools in Washington (state)
Educational institutions established in 1973
1973 establishments in Washington (state)